A steak pie is a traditional meat pie served in Britain. It is made from stewing steak and beef gravy, enclosed in a pastry shell. Sometimes mixed vegetables are included in the filling. The dish is often served with "steak chips" (thickly sliced potatoes fried, sometimes in beef dripping).

Steak pies are also available from chip shops, served with normal chips, referred to in Scotland as a steak pie supper. A steak pie supper is usually accompanied by salt and vinegar; however, around Edinburgh, a combination of spirit vinegar and brown sauce, known simply as "sauce" or "chippie sauce", is popular. The precise proportions of each ingredient are unique to each take-away. Some Fish and Chip shops, particularly in Scotland, heat precooked frozen pies by dropping them into the deep fat fryer.

Throughout the UK, meat pies (as well as burgers and chips) is a traditional hot food eaten at football games either before kick-off or during half time. So synonymous is the meat pie with football in the UK, at the British Pie Awards an award is given for Best Football Pie.

Many Scots celebrate Ne'erday ("New Year's Day") with a dinner of steak pie.

Varieties
Other types of steak pie are available around the world, including in Australia and New Zealand. In Ireland, Guinness Stout is commonly added along with bacon and onions, and the result is commonly referred to as a Steak and Guinness Pie (or Guinness Pie for short). A Steak and Ale pie is a similar creation, popular in British pubs, using one of a variety of ales in place of the Guinness.

See also

 List of pies, tarts and flans

References

Australian pies
British pies
New Zealand pies
Savoury pies
Scottish cuisine
Irish cuisine
Beef steak dishes
British beef dishes